The Serie B 1936–37 was the eighth tournament of this competition played in Italy since its creation.

Teams
Cremonese, Venezia, Spezia and Catanzaro had been promoted from Serie C, while Palermo and Brescia had been relegated from Serie A.

Events
Four teams were relegated following the reform of the Serie C and in order to expand the number of participants to seventeen.

Final classification

Results

Relegation tie-breaker

Classification

Results

Since all the sides finished the play-off at 6 points, a tie-breaker was needed.

Tie-breaker
Semifinal North played in Brescia on July 4:

Semifinal South played in Palermo on July 4:

Final played in Rome on July 11:

Calcio Catania were relegated to Serie C.

See also
 1936–37 Serie A

References and sources
Almanacco Illustrato del Calcio - La Storia 1898-2004, Panini Edizioni, Modena, September 2005

1936-1937
2
Italy